Tabriz Petrochemical CCN Team  (Persian:تیم دوچرخه‌سواری پتروشیمی تبریز)  was an Iranian UCI Continental cycling team managed by Ramin Dadgar and Azim Abdolnezhad and main sponsored by Tabriz Petrochemical Company. The Tabriz Petrochemical Team has achieved first place in both the riders' and teams' overall classifications in the UCI Asia Tour in 2007–2008, 2008–2009 and 2009–2010

History

The Tabriz Petrochemical Team was established in 2002 as a club team in Tabriz, Iran. The team started participating in domestic tours and national leagues, as well as some smaller international tours, including the Presidential Cycling Tour of Turkey, Tour of Perlis, Jelajah Malaysia and Tour de Langkawi. After four years the team registered as a UCI Continental team for the 2007–2008 season.

The team started the 2007–2008 season with a complete roster of domestic riders. In total, the team amassed 909.64 points participating in 5 foreign and 2 domestic international races. As a result, the team won the 2007–2008 UCI Asia Tour. At the end of the season the first three places in the individual ranking were occupied by three Tabriz Petrochemical Cycling Team riders.

For the 2008–2009 season, the team roster remained the same, with the addition of one rider from Kazakhstan. The team again participated in 5 foreign and 2 domestic international UCI tours and in total scored 1015 points, this was approximately double of the second placed team. As in the previous season, the first three places in the individual ranking were occupied by Tabriz riders.

Doping
On 3 June 2013, Hossein Askari returned an adverse analytical finding for the banned substance Methylhexaneamine at the Tour de Singkarak. He was handed a 1-year ban making him eligible to race again 2 June 2014.

On 20 June 2014 Vahid Ghaffari returned an adverse analytical finding for EPO and has been provisionally suspended from competition.

Ahad Kazemi is also currently serving an eight-year ban for an ADRV for testosterone from a sample taken at the 2016 Tour of Iran.

Team roster

Major wins 

2008
Stage 6 Jelajah Malaysia, Hossein Askari
Overall Umm Al Quwain Race, Hossein Askari
Stages 1 & 2, Hossein Nateghi
Overall Taftan Tour, Hossein Nateghi
Stages 1 & 2, Hossein Nateghi
Stage 5, Behnam Khosroshahi
Overall Tour de East Java, Ghader Mizbani
Stage 4, Ghader Mizbani
 Overall President Tour of Iran, Ahad Kazemi
Stage 4, Ahad Kazemi
Stage 5, Ghader Mizbani
Overall Azerbaïjan Tour, Hossein Askari
Prologue & Stage 3, Ghader Mizbani
Stage 2, Team time trial
Stage 4, Behnam Khosroshahi
Stage 7, Hossein Askari
Stage 8, Hamid Shiri
Stages 1 & 4 Tour of Thailand, Hossein Nateghi
Overall Milad De Nour Tour, Ahad Kazemi
Stage 2, Ahad Kazemi
Overall Kerman Tour, Ghader Mizbani
Stage 2, Team time trial
Stage 4, Hossein Nateghi
Overall Tour de Indonesia, Ghader Mizbani
Stage 3, Hossein Jahanbanian
Stages 5 & 10, Ghader Mizbani
2009
Stage 2 Jelajah Malaysia, Mehdi Sohrabi
Overall Tour de Singkarak, Ghader Mizbani
Stage 3a, Ghader Mizbani
 Overall President Tour of Iran, Ghader Mizbani
Stage 1, Hossein Askari
Stage 3, Ghader Mizbani
Overall Tour of Qinghai Lake, Andrey Mizurov
Prologue, Andrey Mizurov
Stages 3 & 8, Ghader Mizbani
Overall Tour de East Java, Andrey Mizurov
Stage 2, Andrey Mizurov
Overall Milad De Nour Tour, Mehdi Sohrabi
Stage 1, Arvin Moazzami
Stages 2 & 4, Mehdi Sohrabi
Stage 3, Samad Pourseyedi
Overall Azerbaijan Tour, Ahad Kazemi
Stage 2, Ahad Kazemi
Stage 4, Mehdi Sohrabi
Stage 5, Ghader Mizbani
Overall Tour de Indonesia, Mehdi Sohrabi
Stage 1, Team time trial
Stage 4, Ghader Mizbani
Stage 6, Mehdi Sohrabi
2010
Overall Azerbaijan Tour, Ghader Mizbani
Stages 1, 5 & 6, Ghader Mizbani
Stage 3, Andrey Mizurov
 Overall President Tour of Iran, Hossein Askari
Stages 2 & 3, Tobias Erler
Stage 4, Hossein Askari
Overall Tour de Kumano, Andrey Mizurov
Overall Tour de Singkarak, Ghader Mizbani
Stage 1, Team Time Trial
Stage 3, Ghader Mizbani
Stage 6, Mehdi Sohrabi
Overall Tour de East Java, Hossein Alizadeh
Stage 1, Hossein Alizadeh
Stage 3 Milad De Nour Tour, Ebrahim Javani
Overall Tour of Qinghai Lake, Hossein Askari
Stage 3, Ghader Mizbani
Stages 6 & 9, Mehdi Sohrabi
2011
Stage 9 Tour de Langkawi, Boris Shpilevsky
Overall Kerman Tour, Mehdi Sohrabi
Stages 1, 2, 3, 4 & 5, Mehdi Sohrabi
Overall Jelajah Malaysia, Mehdi Sohrabi
Stages 1 & 6, Mehdi Sohrabi
Overall Tour de Taiwan, Markus Eibegger
Stage 2, Mehdi Sohrabi
Stage 3, Markus Eibegger
Overall Tour of Thailand, Tobias Erler
Prologue, Tobias Erler
Stage 1 Tour de Korea, Tobias Erler
Overall Azerbaijan Tour, Mehdi Sohrabi
Stage 3, Team Time Trial
Stage 4 President Tour of Iran, Mehdi Sohrabi
Stage 7 Tour of Qinghai Lake, Mehdi Sohrabi
Overall Milad De Nour Tour, Ghader Mizbani
Stage 1, Ghader Mizbani
Stage 5 Tour de Brunei, Ramin Maleki
Stages 4, 5, 6 & 7 Tour of China, Boris Shpilevsky
Overall Tour de East Java, Hossein Jahanbanian
Stage 1, Boris Shpilevsky
Stage 1 Tour of Taihu Lake, Boris Shpilevsky
2012
Overall Tour of Qinghai Lake, Hossein Alizadeh
Stage 3, Hossein Alizadeh
Stage 2 Tour de East Java, Hossein Nateghi
Overall Tour de Brunei, Hossein Askari
Stage 2, Hossein Askari
Stage 3, Hossein Nateghi
2013
Overall Tour de Filipinas, Ghader Mizbani
Stage 3, Mehdi Sohrabi
Stage 4, Ghader Mizbani
 Overall Tour of Iran, Ghader Mizbani
Stage 5, Ghader Mizbani
Overall Tour de Singkarak, Ghader Mizbani
Stage 1, Hossein Askari
Stage 5, Amir Kolahdouz
Stage 7, Mehdi Sohrabi
Overall Tour of Qinghai Lake, Samad Pourseyedi
Stage 3, Samad Pourseyedi
Overall Tour of Borneo, Ghader Mizbani
Stages 2 & 5, Mehdi Sohrabi
Stage 4, Ghader Mizbani
Overall Tour de Ijen, Samad Pourseyedi
Stage 2, Samad Pourseyedi
2014
 Overall Tour de Langkawi, Samad Pourseyedi
Stage 4, Samad Pourseyedi
 Overall Tour of Japan, Samad Pourseyedi
Stage 4, Samad Pourseyedi
Stage 5, Ghader Mizbani
 Overall Tour of Iran, Ghader Mizbani
Stage 5, Ghader Mizbani
 Overall Tour de East Java, Ghader Mizbani
Stage 2, Ghader Mizbani
Stage 4 Tour de Ijen, Mehdi Sohrabi
Overall Tour of Fuzhou, Samad Pourseyedi
Stage 2, Samad Pourseyedi
2015
Stage 4 Tour de Filipinas, Samad Pourseyedi
 Overall Tour de Taiwan, Samad Pourseyedi
Stage 4, Samad Pourseyedi
Overall Tour of Japan, Samad Pourseyedi
Overall Tour of Iran, Samad Pourseyedi
Stage 5, Samad Pourseyedi
Stage 3 Tour de Singkarak, Mehdi Sohrabi
Stage 4 Tour de Singkarak, Amir Kolahdouz
Stage 5 Tour de Singkarak, Behnam Maleki
Stage 8 Tour de Singkarak, Ahad Kazemi

National champions

2009
 Iran Time Trial Championships, Mehdi Sohrabi
 Kazakhstan Time Trial Championships, Andrey Mizourov
2010
 Kazakhstan Time Trial Championships, Andrey Mizourov
 Iran Time Trial Championships, Hossein Askari
 Iran Road Race Championships, Mehdi Sohrabi
2011
 Iran Time Trial Championships, Hossein Askari
2012
 Iran Road Race Championships, Hossein Alizadeh
2013
 Iran Road Race Championships, Ghader Mizbani
2014
 Iran Time Trial Championships, Alireza Haghi
2015
 Iran Road Race Championships, Behnam Maleki

See also 
 Petrochimi Tabriz F.C.
 Petroshimi Tabriz FSC

References

External links
 Tabriz Petrochemical Team's Official website web.archive.org
 Tabriz Petrochemical Team's Profile in CyclingWebsite.com
 Tabriz Petrochemical Official website

Cycling teams based in Iran
UCI Continental Teams (Asia)
Cycling teams established in 2002
Sport in Tabriz